On January 22, 2016, four people were killed and seven others injured in a shooting spree in La Loche, Saskatchewan, Canada. Two brothers were killed at their home, and two teachers were killed at the Dene Building of the La Loche Community School. A 17-year-old male suspect was apprehended and placed into custody.

Shootings

According to police, the shootings began at a residence in the 300 block of Dene Crescent, where the suspect shot two of his cousins some time before  He then went to La Loche Community School's Dene Building and began firing at around 1:05, shortly before lunch ended, reportedly with a shotgun. He fired at least six or seven shots inside the building, killing a teacher and an assistant and wounding seven others. The school shooting lasted for about eight minutes.

Between 1:08 and 1:10, a suspect with a gun was spotted by a responding officer, who chased him through the building and eventually arrested him outside at 1:15. Afterwards, police were notified of the bodies at the residence on Dene Crescent. Both the Dene Building and the elementary school were put on lockdown during the shooting. The suspect had reportedly posted his intentions on Facebook.

Of about 350 enrolled students, around 150 were at school at the time, since many had taken final exams that morning and had no further classes.

Victims
The deceased were identified as brothers Dayne, 17, and Drayden Fontaine, 13; and teachers Adam Wood, 35, and Marie Janvier, 21. Janvier and the Fontaine brothers died at the scene, and Wood died later in the local hospital. Seven other people were injured. The four most seriously wounded were flown to and hospitalized at Royal University Hospital in Saskatoon. All were in critical condition two days after the shootings, according to an official in the Saskatchewan government. On , an official said three had been released.

Perpetrator 
Police did not release the name of the suspect at the time, as he was protected by a publication ban as required by Canada's Youth Criminal Justice Act. Police said he was a student at the school and that he is 17. According to friends, he was bullied at school for his appearance. After the Supreme Court of Canada appeal, the publication ban was lifted revealing his name to be Randan Dakota Fontaine. After the publication ban was lifted, his court statement gave no rationale for his attack, and Fontaine repeatedly denied he was bullied.

Reactions and aftermath

Canadian Prime Minister Justin Trudeau, Saskatchewan Premier Brad Wall, U.S. Ambassador to Canada Bruce Heyman and other Canadian politicians issued statements expressing their condolences and shock at the shooting. Wall pledged counselling support and to cover costs for those travelling to see the hospitalized victims in Saskatoon. Kevin Janvier, the acting mayor of La Loche, and Georgina Jolibois, MP for the Desnethé—Missinippi—Churchill River electoral district, called to have the school torn down and rebuilt in light of the trauma caused by the shootings.

On , prior to a hockey game at the Air Canada Centre, the Toronto Maple Leafs and Montreal Canadiens had a minute of silence for the victims.

RCMP Superintendent Grant St. Germaine called the incident the worst shooting tragedy in Canadian history at a high school or elementary school. Reuters reported that it was the worst Canadian school shooting since the École Polytechnique massacre of 1989, in which fourteen were killed.

Classes at La Loche Community School were suspended immediately after the shooting. On , the local school board, Northern Lights School Division No. 113, told parents the school would reopen in seven to ten more days, though the reopening was postponed to at least . Plans to tear down the school were considered, but not passed. It said that it was willing to implement a security program at that time, following community discussion on what that should entail. In the meantime, the elementary school building remains open for students to gather, receive counselling, and play floor hockey. Exams for the first semester were cancelled for students who had not taken them on the morning of the shootings.

On January 29, Trudeau and Wall visited La Loche, where the former met with community leaders. Earlier that morning, a moment of silence was held in schools located across Saskatchewan.

Legal proceedings
On , the suspect was charged with four counts of first-degree murder, seven counts of attempted murder, and one count of unauthorized possession of a firearm. Two days later, he was arraigned in a provincial court in Meadow Lake, then remanded to a youth facility. Authorities have stated that they would like to sentence him as an adult if he is convicted. On October 28, 2016 the teen pleaded guilty to two counts of first degree murder, two counts of second degree murder and seven counts of attempted murder. On May 8, 2018, the gunman was sentenced to life imprisonment with no chance of parole for 10 years. On October 31, 2019, the Saskatchewan Court of Appeals upheld his conviction and adult sentence. On April 16, 2020, the Supreme Court of Canada refused leave to appeal his conviction and sentence. As a result, he has exhausted all of his legal appeals.

See also
 List of massacres in Canada
 List of attacks related to secondary schools

Notes

References

External links

Murder in Saskatchewan
2016 crimes in Canada
2016 in Saskatchewan
Mass murder in 2016
Attacks in Canada in 2016
Deaths by firearm in Saskatchewan
School shootings committed by pupils
January 2016 crimes in North America
Mass shootings in Canada
Massacres in Canada
School killings in Canada
School shootings in Canada
Spree shootings in Canada
2016 mass shootings in Canada